The 1983 Arizona State Sun Devils baseball team represented Arizona State University in the 1983 NCAA Division I baseball season. The Sun Devils played their home games at Packard Stadium, and played as part of the Pacific-10 Conference. The team was coached by Jim Brock in his twelfth season as head coach at Arizona State.

The Sun Devils reached the College World Series, their twelfth appearance in Omaha, where they finished tied for third place after winning games against  and Oklahoma State and losing twice to eventual runner-up Alabama.

Personnel

Roster

Coaches

Schedule and results

References

Arizona State Sun Devils baseball seasons
Arizona State Sun Devils
College World Series seasons
Arizona State Sun Devils baseball